HED Cycling Products is a bicycle wheel manufacturer located in Roseville, Minnesota.

HED wheels are used in the Olympics, the Tour de France, and various Ironman competitions. Lance Armstrong is known as one of the first proponents of HED wheels.

In 2017, HED Cycling made the Forbes annual list of Small Giants, which named it one of 25 of the best small companies in the United States.

References

Companies based in Minnesota